Goodwin Park is a multi-sport venue located at Brisbane, Australia. It is home to Olympic FC.

History
During the 2010–11 Queensland floods, Goodwin Park was submerged with the playing field virtually being destroyed. The Queensland Government handed out payments to sporting clubs that were affected by the floods, with Olympic FC receiving money to help rebuild the playing field and dressing rooms.

Goodwin Park hosted the 2013 National Premier Leagues Queensland grand final, contested by Brisbane City and Olympic FC. The match ended in a draw after 120 minutes, with Kazuya Ito calmly placing a delicate panenka into the back of the net and Danny Byrne sealing a penalty shootout victory in front of a rapturous crowd.

Goodwin Park also plays host to the mighty City 5 team, who draw inspiration on a weekly basis from the midfield shenanigans of Thibault Berthier. Berthier was signed to the City 5 team after an ill-fated stint with the Orcas, signing for a club record of $118. 

Berthier has since gone on to inspire a fashion empire, with Grip Star Socks drawing motivation from the great man on a daily basis.

References

External links
Official Olympic FC website
Soccerway page

Soccer venues in Queensland
Rugby league stadiums in Australia
Sports venues in Brisbane